The Korea Association of Standards and Testing Organizations (KASTO) is an association of the standards and testing organizations of South Korea.

History
The KASTO was established in 1979 to ensure efficient operation of the national calibration service.

Courses
The KASTO provides courses training metrological technicians and officials.

See also
 KATS
 KRISS
 KSA

References

Citations

Bibliography
 .

External links
 . 

Standards organizations in South Korea
1979 establishments in South Korea